Frank Pollack may refer to:

Frank Pollack (American football), former offensive tackle
Frank L. Pollack, early American science fiction writer and author